Sant'Elia a Pianisi is a comune (municipality) in the Province of Campobasso in the Italian region Molise, located about  northeast of Campobasso.

Sant'Elia a Pianisi borders the following municipalities: Bonefro, Carlantino, Colletorto, Macchia Valfortore, Monacilioni, Ripabottoni, San Giuliano di Puglia.

Near Sant'Elia are the ruins of the mediaeval Castello di Pianisi, first mentioned in documents of the second half of the thirteenth century. It is not known how or when the castle was destroyed.

Transportation 
Sant'Elia a Pianisi  is served by a railway station, the Ripabottoni-S:Elia railway station, on the Termoli-Campobasso and Termoli–Venafro line.

Demographic evolution

References

Cities and towns in Molise